Gruyère is a hard yellow cheese made from cow's milk, named after the town of Gruyères

Gruyère or Gruyere may also refer to:
 Gruyère (district), a district of the canton of Fribourg in Switzerland
 Gruyère cream, a cream from the Gruyère district
 Gruyères, a town in the Gruyère district, known for the cheese named after it
 Gruyères, Ardennes, a commune in France
 Gruyere, Victoria, a town in the Yarra Valley wine region east of Melbourne, Australia
 Gruyere Gold Mine, a mine in Western Australia